Ernst Andersson (26 March 1909 – 9 October 1989) was a Swedish footballer who played for IFK Göteborg. He represented Sweden at the 1934 FIFA World Cup.

Honours 
IFK Göteborg

 Allsvenskan: 1934–35, 1941–42

References

External links
 
 

1909 births
1989 deaths
Swedish footballers
Sweden international footballers
Swedish football managers
1934 FIFA World Cup players
IFK Göteborg players
IFK Göteborg managers
Association football midfielders